Rari Nantes Savona is an aquatic sports club based in Savona, Italy, mainly known for its men's water polo team, which competes uninterruptedly in the Serie A1, the top division of Italian championship, since 1982; the team has been national champion for three times.

History
The club was founded in 1948 by Mario Caviglione with a group of other water polo enthusiasts. After several years in the amateur leagues, in 1975 the club reached Serie B (back then the second tier of Italian championship) and achieved the promotion in Serie A six years later, in the 1981 season. The first game of Savona in the Top division was a 12−9 home victory against 1980 champions Canottieri Napoli, on 27 February 1982.

At the time, the club used to play its home games in the near Albissola Marina and at the Genoa's Crocera swimming pool. The city of Savona built an Olympic-sized pool in 1985, the Piscina Olimpica Comunale, renamed Piscina Carlo Zanelli in 2010 in honour of the recently deceased former mayor of the town. The pool has been the home field of the club ever since, except for a 5 years of absence from 2006 to 2010 due to restructuring works. During the break, the team used to play at the Piscina di Luceto in Albisola Superiore.

RN Savona emerged as a top team in the early 1990s. The first trophy of the Ligurian team's history is the 1989−90 Coppa Italia; in the following season, after two second places reached in 1983 and 1990, the club won its first Italian Championship and a second consecutive domestic Cup. Savona won its second Italian title in 1992 and the third in the 2004−05 season; since then the club managed to reach two back-to-back second places in 2009−10 and 2010−11 seasons, losing on both occasions the play-offs final to Pro Recco; the third Coppa Italia dates back to the 1992−93 season. The club made its international debut in the 1983 LEN Cup Winners' Cup. In 2012 the team, defeating in the final game Spain's CN Sabadell, won the first edition of the newly renamed LEN Euro Cup, a competition that the club already won twice in 2005 and 2011 when it was still called LEN Trophy; on all three occasions Savona earned the right to contest the LEN Super Cup, but never managed to achieve the trophy, being defeated twice by Italy's fellow sides CN Posillipo and Pro Recco and once by Serbia's VK Partizan. The best performance in the major European cup came in the 1991–92 season, when Savona reached the Final but lost to Croatia's Jadran Split.

Honours
Domestic
 National Championship: 
Winner: 3 (1990−91, 1991−92, 2004−05)
Runner-up: 5 (1983, 1989−90, 1992−93, 2009−10, 2010−11)
 Coppa Italia (National Cup of Italy):
Winner: 3 (1989−90, 1990−91, 1992−93)
Runner-up: 7 (1986−87, 2004−05, 2005−06, 2007−08, 2008−09, 2009−10, 2012−13)

International
 LEN Euro Cup/LEN Trophy: 
Winner: 3 (2004−05, 2010−11, 2011−12)
Runner-up: 1 (2009−10)
 LEN Champions League:
Runner-up: 1 (1991−92)

Recent seasons

Current roster
2019−20 season

Head coach: Alberto Angelini

Notable former players

 Matteo Aicardi
 Alberto Angelini
 Gianni Averaimo
 Alessandro Bovo
 Arnaldo Deserti
 Manuel Estiarte
 Maurizio Felugo
 Massimiliano Ferretti
 Marco Gerini
 Massimo Giacoppo
 Alex Giorgetti
 Alexandros Gounas
 Mlađan Janović
 Viktor Jelenić
  Predrag Jokić
 Tamás Kásás
  Tamás Märcz
  Felipe Perrone
  Bogdan Rath
  Aleksandar Šapić
  Dubravko Šimenc
  Slobodan Soro
 István Udvardi
 Peter Varellas
 Zsolt Varga
 Mirko Vičević
  Goran Volarević

Synchronised swimming
In addition to the water polo team, Rari Nantes Savona also has a successful synchronised swimming section that was created in 1986 and has become a national top club since 1991 (when it reached the second place at the Italian championship). The team raised several international athletes like Giulia Lapi, multiple European medalist and part of the Italian Olympic team in Beijing 2008 and London 2012. The club won 15 synchronised swimming national overall championships.
Honours:
 Italian championships: 15 (1994, 1995, 1996, 2007, 2008, 2009, 2010, 2011, 2012, 2013, 2014, 2015, 2016, 2017, 2018)

References

External links
Official website

Water polo clubs in Liguria    
Water polo clubs in Italy
Sports clubs established in 1948
Savona
Sport in Liguria
Synchronised swimming in Italy